Viktor Tietz (13 April, 1859, Rumburg (northwest Bohemia, Austrian Monarchy  8 December, 1937, Karlsbad, Bohemia, Czechoslovakia) was an ethnic-German Austrian and Czechoslovak chess player, chess life organizer and local politician.

He took 7th at Breslau 1889 (the 6th DSB Congress, Hauptturnier A won by Emanuel Lasker), and won ahead of Dawid Janowski and Moritz Porges at Carlsbad 1902 (Triangular).

He invented the tie-break system now called the Tietz system. His name is attached to the chess club in Karlovy Vary. He was a main organizer of four famous international tournaments: the Carlsbad 1907, the Carlsbad 1911, the Carlsbad 1923, and the Carlsbad 1929.

References

External links 
 
 Viktor Tietz - legenda karlovarské šachové hry 

1859 births
1937 deaths
19th-century Czech people
20th-century Czech people
19th-century Austrian people
Austro-Hungarian people
German Bohemian people
Czech chess players
Austrian chess players
Chess patrons
People from Rumburk
19th-century chess players